Aulonium is a genus of cylindrical bark beetles in the family Zopheridae.

Selected species
 Aulonium aequicolle LeConte, 1859
 Aulonium bicolor (Herbst, 1797)
 Aulonium bidentatum Fabricius, 1801
 Aulonium cylindricum Hinton, 1936
 Aulonium ferrugineum Zimmermann, 1869
 Aulonium grande Dajoz, 1980
 Aulonium guyanense Dajoz, 1980
 Aulonium longicolle Dajoz, 1980
 Aulonium longum LeConte, 1866
 Aulonium minutum Dajoz, 1980
 Aulonium parallelopipedum (Say, 1826)
 Aulonium ruficorne (Olivier, 1790)
 Aulonium sulcicolle Wollaston, 1864
 Aulonium thoracicum Dajoz, 1980
 Aulonium trisulcum (Geoffroy, 1785)
 Aulonium tuberculatum LeConte, 1863
 Aulonium ulmoides (Pascoe, 1860)
 Aulonium vicinum Dajoz, 1980

References

Zopheridae